Wilhelm Raabe (September 8, 1831November 15, 1910) was a German novelist. His early works were published under the pseudonym of Jakob Corvinus.

Biography
He was born in Eschershausen (then in the Duchy of Brunswick, now in the Holzminden District). After attending gymnasia in Holzminden and Wolfenbüttel, he entered a bookstore in Magdeburg as apprentice in 1849. He used this opportunity for wide reading and enriched himself with the tales and folklore of his own and other countries.  He remained an apprentice until 1854.

Tiring of the routine of business, he then studied philosophy at Berlin (1855–1857). While a student at that university, under his pseudonym he published his first work, The Chronicle of Sparrow Lane (1857) (German: Die Chronik der Sperlingsgasse). This book, which contains sketches of life among the German bourgeoisie, quickly became popular.

With this encouragement, Raabe gave up his studies and devoted himself entirely to literary work.  He returned to Wolfenbüttel, and then lived (1862–1870) in Stuttgart. Then he again returned to Brunswick and remained active until the end of the century, publishing upwards of 30 novels and a number of short stories and sketches.

Work

Raabe's life work may be divided into three periods. During the first, he wrote with a light touch, producing a series of pictures of German life from the abundance of his imagination and experience, among which are: 
 Die Chronik der Sperlingsgasse (1856)
 Die Kinder von Finkenrode (1859)
 Unser Herrgotts Kanzlei (1862)

The influence of the pessimism of Schopenhauer is evident during the second period. Representative works of this period are: 
 Der Hungerpastor (1864)
 Abu Telfan (1867)
 Der Schüdderump (1870)
These three works are sometimes referred to as a trilogy. While they are independent of each other in substance, they do represent a distinct epoch in the life of Raabe.

During the third period of the novelist's life his works no longer show this pessimistic strain. A genial humor pervades them, reminiscent of Dickens, though they frequently deal with serious subjects. Horacker (1876) perhaps best represents this tendency, and has been cited as his masterpiece. Der Dräumling (1872), and Deutscher Mondschein (1873), also come under this head. Of his numerous later works Das Odfeld (1889) and Die Akten des Vogelsangs (1895) seemed to be most read. Kloster Lugau (1894) and Hastenbeck (1899) also belong to this period.

Raabe's early works were influenced to some extent by Jean Paul. Later he shows evidences of having read Dickens and Thackeray.

His estimation by the German people was especially shown at the celebration of his 70th birthday in 1901. Beginning in 1965, the critical edition of Raabe's complete works was published as Sämtliche Werke (Braunschweiger Ausgabe) commissioned by the Braunschweigischen Wissenschaftlichen Gesellschaft and edited by Karl Hoppe.

Works
Die Chronik der Sperlingsgasse, 1856
Ein Frühling, Der Weg zum Lachen, 1857
Die alte Universität, Der Student von Wittenberg, Weihnachtsgeister, Lorenz Scheibenhart, Einer aus der Menge, 1858
Die Kinder von Finkenrode, Der Junker von Denow, Wer kann es wenden? 1859
Aus dem Lebensbuch des Schulmeisterleins Michel Haas, Ein Geheimnis, 1860
Auf dunkelm Grunde, Die schwarze Galeere, Der heilige Born, Nach dem großen Kriege, 1861
Unseres Herrgotts Kanzlei, Das letzte Recht, 1862
Eine Grabrede aus dem Jahre 1609, Die Leute aus dem Walde, Holunderblüte, Die Hämelschen Kinder, 1863
Der Hungerpastor, Keltische Knochen, 1864
Else von der Tanne, Drei Federn, 1865
Die Gänse von Bützow, Sankt Thomas, Gedelöcke, 1866
Abu Telfan; oder Heimkehr aus dem Mondgebirge, 1867
Theklas Erbschaft, 1868
Im Siegeskranze, 1869
Der Schüdderump, Der Marsch nach Hause, Des Reiches Krone, 1870
Der Dräumling, 1872
Deutscher Mondschein, Christoph Pechlin, 1873
Meister Autor oder Die Geschichten vom versunkenen Garten, Höxter und Corvey, 1874
Frau Salome, Vom alten Proteus, Eulenpfingsten, 1875
Die Innerste, Der gute Tag, Horacker, 1876
Auf dem Altenteil, 1878
Alte Nester, Wunnigel, 1879
Deutscher Adel, 1880
Das Horn von Wanza, 1881
Fabian und Sebastian, 1882
Prinzessin Fisch, 1883
Villa Schönow, Pfisters Mühle, Zum wilden Mann, Ein Besuch, 1884
Unruhige Gäste, 1885
Im alten Eisen, 1887
Das Odfeld, 1888
Der Lar, 1889
Stopfkuchen, 1891
Gutmanns Reisen, 1892
Kloster Lugau, 1894
Die Akten des Vogelsangs, 1896
Hastenbeck, 1899
Altershausen (fragment, 1902; published 1911)

Raabe the painter

Raabe also had a less known talent for painting. Approximately 600 of his works exist, partially in private ownership of his descendants or with the Braunschweig Museum.

Notes

External links

 
 Works by Raabe at Projekt Gutenberg-DE 
 
 

1831 births
1910 deaths
19th-century German novelists
People from Holzminden (district)
People from the Duchy of Brunswick
German male novelists
19th-century German male writers